Big Canoe is the second studio album released by former Split Enz frontman Tim Finn in April 1986. The album peaked at number 3 in New Zealand and number 31 in Australia.

Track listing

LP Listing

CD Listing 
The CD included the extra songs "Searching the Streets" and "Hole in My Heart".

The introduction track "Spiritual Hunger" began life as a Split Enz demo called "Mr Catalyst"

Personnel 

 Tim Finn - vocals, keyboards & Piano
 Geoff Dugmore - drums, percussion and the occasional scream
 Steve Greetham - Bass
 Jon McLoughlin - Guitars (One Red, One White)
 Phil Judd - Sitar/Guitar on Hyacinth, Extra Rhythm Guitar on Water Into Wine, Intro Composition, Solo & Guitar Synth on Spiritual Hunger, Brass arrangements in So Deep plus contributions to Nick's footwear
 Norma Lewis - Backing vocals
 Wendy Harris - Backing vocals

Additional personnel 

 Mark McGann - Backing vocals on Hyacinth
 Paul Wickens - Keyboards
 Danny Schogger - Keyboards
 Anne Dudley - String Arrangements
 Skaila Kanga - Harp on Hyacinth
 Pandit Dinesh - Tabla & Indian Percussion on No Thunder, No Fire, No Rain
 Danny Cummings - Congas on Searching The Streets
 Gary Barnacle - Electric Sax & Solos
 Luke Tunney - Trumpet
 Simon Gardner - Trumpet
 Pete Toms - Trombone
 All songs arranged by Tim & Nick, with help from the band.

Charts

Certifications

References 

Tim Finn albums
1986 albums
Albums produced by Nick Launay
Virgin Records albums